Simple Object Database Access, also known as S.O.D.A. or SODA, is an API for database queries.

Database APIs